OECD iLibrary is OECD’s Online Library for books, papers and statistics and the gateway to OECD's analysis and data. It replaced SourceOECD in July 2010.

OECD iLibrary contains content released by OECD (Organisation for Economic Cooperation and Development), International Energy Agency (IEA), Nuclear Energy Agency (NEA), OECD Development Centre, PISA (Programme for International Student Assessment), and International Transport Forum (ITF). All content is hosted by the OECD so users can find - and cite - tables and databases as easily as articles or chapters in any available content format: PDF, WEB, XLS, DATA, ePUB.

OECD iLibrary is listed in the Registry of Research Data Repositories re3data.org.

WTO iLibrary has been developed by the OECD publishing in relation to OECD iLibrary.

OECD Publications 
The OECD releases between 300 and 500 books each year. Most books are published in English and French. The OECD also publishes reports, statistics, working papers and reference materials. All titles and databases published since 1998 can be accessed via OECD iLibrary.

Access 
OECD iLibrary provides access to all OECD's publications, working papers and datasets, published since 1998 (and some older titles too) to anyone with an internet connection. It also offers premium services to subscribers. Any individual or organisation can purchase a subscription, but subscribers are usually universities and research organisations, businesses, governments and public administration, non-governmental organisation and think tanks.

References

External links
 OECD iLibrary
 Organisation for Economic Co-operation and Development

OECD
Libraries established in 2010
French digital libraries